Laurie Williams is an American software engineer known for her writings on pair programming and agile software development. She is a distinguished professor of computer science at North Carolina State University, and interim head of the Department of Computer Science at North Carolina State University.

Education and career
Williams graduated from Lehigh University in 1984, with a bachelor's degree in industrial engineering. After earning an M.B.A. from Duke University in 1990, she completed a Ph.D. at the University of Utah in 2000. Her dissertation, The Collaborative Software Process, was supervised by Robert R. Kessler.

She joined the North Carolina State University in 2000, and was named a distinguished professor in 2018.

Books
With Robert R. Kessler, Williams is the author of the book Pair Programming Illuminated (Addison-Wesley, 2002).
With Michele Marchesi, Giancarlo Succi, and James Donovan Wells, she is an author of Extreme Programming Perspectives (Addison-Wesley, 2003).

Recognition
In 2009, Williams became one of the two inaugural winners of the ACM SIGSOFT Influential Educator Award, for her work on pair programming in computer science education.
In 2018, Williams was elected as a Fellow of the IEEE "for contributions to reliable and secure software engineering".

References

External links
Home page

Year of birth missing (living people)
Living people
American computer scientists
American women computer scientists
Lehigh University alumni
Fuqua School of Business alumni
University of Utah alumni
North Carolina State University faculty
Software engineering researchers
American software engineers
Fellow Members of the IEEE
American women academics
21st-century American women